Micronecta is a genus of aquatic insects in the Corixidae family.

References 
 Micronecta at Fauna Europaea

External links 
 Micronecta at the Microcosmos of Pond and Stream

Micronectinae
Nepomorpha genera
Hemiptera of Europe
Taxa named by George Willis Kirkaldy